El Ballestero is a municipality in Albacete, Castile-La Mancha, Spain. It is 68 km west of Albacete, a small town in La Mancha. The municipality was likely founded after the meeting between Alfonso X (the wise) and his son-in-law,  Jaime I of Aragón. The goal of the meeting was to settle the ownership of the recently captured territory.  Local legend has it that this fertile, well-watered area was settled by crossbowmen ("ballestero" in Spanish) now redundant following the cessation of hostilities.  The town was established around a crossroads on the main road between Munera and Robledo.

Like many of the small towns in La Mancha, El Ballestero lost a significant share of its population in the mid-20th century. In the 1949 census, El Ballestero had 1,858 inhabitants, but the population shrank over the following decades; in the peak emigration year, 1964, over 500 left. The emigrants largely moved to large cities and the coast, where employment opportunities had increased in the growing tourist industry. In recent years, many abandoned homes have been purchased by people from Madrid, Valencia and other large cities who have refurbished them as second homes.  Over the last 10 years, the number of abandoned houses still in ruins has reduced substantially.

Facilities
The town hosts an 18th-century church built in the Renaissance style, two bars serving food, a supermarket, a pharmacy, a bread shop, a hairdresser, a public library, a bank, a school and an Olympic-sized swimming pool which is open to the public in July and August. On weekends, a music bar opens its doors. There is a small market held on Thursdays.  There are also various guest houses (casas rurales) and a small hotel.

Economy
The main industry is farming (largely lamb, wheat and barley), but there is also a large factory producing embutidos and hams. 

El Ballestero has many wind turbines. In June, crops are harvested and the countryside looks like a prairie. La Mancha has the slow-growing Juniperus sabina, now fully protected and beginning to rebound..

Tourism
The town is on the Ruta de Don Quijote, and nearby attractions include Libisosa, the remains of a Roman town near Lezuza; Alcaraz, a medieval town; Las Lagunas de Ruidera; and the Sierra de Alcaraz, a home to wildlife. El Santuario de Nuestra Señora de Cortes is also nearby.

In addition to the fictional hero Don Quixote, Hannibal, the Carthaginian general who almost conquered Rome in the 3rd century BCE also passed close to the town along a prehistoric track that crosses the Iberian Peninsula; this ancient road was rebuilt by the Romans, and some 800 metres remain in good condition north of town. The Cañada Real de Los Serranos, which forms part of the medieval network of cattle tracks across Spain between Cordoba and Teruel is slightly further north.

Climate

In summer, the temperature during the day is significantly hotter than in coastal towns such as Benidorm. However, because of its elevation of 3,000 feet (1045 metres) above sea level, the nights stay cool even in midsummer , and the town fills with people from the coast and Madrid in July and August, many with secondary homes here.

In autumn, the town is popular with those who hunt the abundant hares, rabbits and partridges.

In winter, the temperature can fall well below zero and it snows several times a year, although it tends to melt after a few days.

The main local fiestas are San Lorenzo (10 August) and San Miguel (29 September).

Virgen de la Encarnación
A local tradition that takes place on Whitsunday and the Feast of St Michael is Virgen de la Encarnación, celebrating events that took place 400 years ago. According to tradition, in the 17th century, a severe plague outbreak occurred in Villalgordal, a small village 14 km south of El Ballestero. This epidemic killed most of the population; this was possibly the Great Plague of Seville of 1646 to 1652. Once it was over, the survivors decided to burn down the village on health grounds and moved to the surrounding towns. The majority came to El Ballestero and brought with them their "Virgen de la Encarnación", a statue of the Virgin Mary slightly smaller than life size, to place in the local church. Each Whitsunday, the villagers come together and carry her over the old track to the site of Villalgordal which is now merely a stony field with a small refurbished chapel in the middle of it overlooking a river. Once they get to Villalgordal, the Virgin is returned to her original home in the chapel and a mass is celebrated. The town then provides a meal for all the participants and spectators. Once this is over, the chapel is locked up and the townsfolk return home.

On 29 September, during the Fiesta de San Miguel, there is another Mass at Villalgordal and, after another meal, she is carried back to El Ballestero being met at the entrance to the town by floats depicting local life. She is escorted back to the church whilst bonfires are lit in celebration of her return. This is followed by a firework display.

The statue spends the winter in the church and is returned to its summer chapel the following year. This has been done for around 400 years.

References

External links

Mayorship site
Community website

Municipalities of the Province of Albacete